The Raid on Algiers took place on 11 December 1942, in the Algiers harbour. The participating commandos were captured after setting limpet mines which sank two Allied ships and damaged two more.

The raid
On 4 December 1942,   a submarine of the Italian Royal Navy (Regia Marina) left the naval base of La Spezia, carrying three manned torpedoes and 10 commando frogmen. Air reconnaissance had discovered that the port of Algiers was crowded with Allied cargo ships, so the Italian High Command decided to launch an operation involving both human torpedoes and combat swimmers carrying limpet mines. One of the swimmers was employed as scout on the surface, and he guided the submarine toward a position  from the southern entrance to the harbour. He spotted six steamers at 21:45, and informed the presence of targets to Ambra by phone. The other swimmers and the manned torpedoes begun to emerge at 23:45 after some delay. The observer reported an intense reaction from the harbour defences. The submarine awaited to recover the operators until 03:00, an hour after the original time set. Then the scout swimmer was recalled on board and Ambra departed back to La Spezia. Meanwhile, at 05:00, the explosions started to rock the freighters. The Norwegian Berta (1,493 tons) was sunk, while  Ocean Vanquisher (7,174 tons),  Empire Centaur (7,041 tons) and Armatan (4,587 tons) were heavily damaged. The American landing ship LSM-59 became stranded on the beach. Sixteen Italian divers were captured.

Notes

References
 "Frogmen First Battles" by retired U.S Captain William Schofield. 
 "Sea Devils" by J. Valerio Borghese, translated into English by James Cleugh, with introduction by the United States Naval Institute

Further reading
 The Italian Navy in World War II by Marc'Antonio Bragadin, United States Naval Institute, Annapolis, 1957. 
 The Italian Navy in World War II by Sadkovich, James, Greenwood Press, Westport, 1994.

External links

 "Principal Operations of the 10th Light Flotilla" - RegiaMarina.net  
 La fine delle Illusioni - RegiaMarinaItaliana.it  
 L'incredibile impresa del Comandante Arillo con il sommergibile "Ambra" nella tana del lupo per uscirne indenne e vittorioso - BascoGrigioverde 
 Ambra 

Algiers
1942 in Italy
Algiers
1942 in Algeria
Algiers
Algiers
Algiers
Algiers
Algiers
December 1942 events